Satyadev Katare was an Indian politician who served as Home minister of M.P., MLA four time MLA from Ater (Vidhan Sabha constituency) and the leader of the opposition in the Madhya Pradesh Legislative Assembly. Katare died on 20 October 2016 in Mumbai, Maharashtra.

References 

People from Bhind district
Indian National Congress politicians
Madhya Pradesh MLAs 1985–1990
Madhya Pradesh MLAs 2003–2008
2016 deaths
1955 births
Leaders of the Opposition in Madhya Pradesh
Madhya Pradesh MLAs 2013–2018
Indian National Congress politicians from Madhya Pradesh